WTBM-CD (channel 24) is a low-power, Class A television station in Birmingham, Alabama, United States, affiliated with the Spanish-language Telemundo network. It is owned by Gray Television alongside Fox affiliate WBRC (channel 6). The two stations studios atop Red Mountain (between Vulcan Trail and Valley View Drive) in southeastern Birmingham; WTBM-CD's transmitter is located along Golden Crest Drive, also atop Red Mountain.

WTBM-CD's signal is relayed on low-power, class A digital translator, WJMY-CD (channel 25) in Tuscaloosa.

The station launched its current affiliation on September 1, 2022.

Technical information

Subchannels
The station's digital signal is multiplexed:

Analog-to-digital conversion
The then-WBXA-CD discontinued regular programming on its analog signal, over VHF channel 2, on June 3, 2015, a little under three months prior to the official date in which Class A low-power analog television stations in the United States transitioned from analog to digital broadcasts under federal mandate. The station's digital signal remained on its pre-transition UHF channel 24.

References

External links

TBM-CD
Television channels and stations established in 1994
1994 establishments in Alabama
Low-power television stations in the United States
Telemundo network affiliates
Gray Television